Soren Bryce is an American electronic indie pop musician from Amarillo, Texas. Bryce was previously signed to Washington Square records, an imprint of Razor & Tie.

History
Bryce began her career by releasing her debut self-titled EP in August 2015 on Washington Square, after raising over $10,000 via PledgeMusic. The album was produced by David Kahne. Bryce released the first song from the EP via Kick Kick Snare. Bryce released the second song and lead single from the EP via NPR's All Songs Considered. Bryce released a third song from the EP via Billboard. Bryce released a fourth song from the EP via Bullett Magazine. The EP received three out of four stars by ABC News music reviewer Allan Raible.

Bryce came in third place in The Deli Magazine's "Los Angeles Readers/Fans Poll".

In 2017, Bryce released a song titled Cellophane.

On June 13, 2018 Bryce released the follow up album to her self titled EP named Discussions With Myself. The album is composed of 11 tracks made in 2016.

Discography
EPs
Soren Bryce (2015, Washington Square)

Albums

Discussions with Myself (2018, Independent)

References

American indie pop musicians
Musicians from Texas